If I Had One Wish is a young adult novel by Jackie French Koller, about a teenager named Alec Lansing, whose little brother Stevie is always getting him in trouble. The book was first published in 1991.

Plot
One day an old woman grants Alec one wish for his kindness to her. Alec uses it to wish that his little brother Stevie had never been born; to his horror, it comes true. Although no one else remembers Stevie, and Alec's life is in some ways better now, he is still guilt-stricken, and desperately tries to find a way to reverse his wish.

Adaptation
In 2003, the story was adapted as a Disney Channel Original Movie titled You Wish!.

First edition
Little, Brown & Co., 1991

1991 American novels
American novels adapted into films
American young adult novels
American novels adapted into television shows
Novels by Jackie French Koller